Jay and Kai + 6 is the fifth album by jazz trombonists J.J. Johnson and Kai Winding, credited on this album as The Jay and Kai Trombone Octet. The title refers to the six trombonists (including two bass trombonists) who accompany Johnson and Winding on the recording.  Columbia Records released the album (Columbia CL 892) as a monaural LP record in 1956.  In December 1956, Jay and Kai + 6 reached the № 3 position on the Billboard jazz chart.

Track listing 
The following track listing refers to the original LP configuration.

Personnel 
 J.J. Johnson – trombone, trombonium, arranger
 Kai Winding – trombone, trombonium, arranger
 Urbie Green – trombone
 Bob Alexander – trombone
 Eddie Bert – trombone
 Jimmy Cleveland – trombone
 Tom Mitchell – bass trombone
 Bart Varsalona – bass trombone
 Hank Jones – piano
 Milt Hinton – bass ("Piece For Two Tromboniums", "Rise 'N' Shine", "No Moon at All", "Surrey With The Fringe On Top", "You're My Thrill", "Jeanne", "You Don't Know What Love Is")
 Ray Brown – bass ("Night In Tunisia", "All At Once You Love Her", "The Peanut Vendor", "The Continental")
 Osie Johnson – drums
 Candido Camero – conga ("A Night in Tunisia"), bongo ("All At Once You Love Her", "The Peanut Vendor")

References

Kai Winding albums
J. J. Johnson albums
Albums produced by George Avakian
Columbia Records albums
1956 albums